Speak, Silence: In Search of W. G. Sebald is a 2021 book by Carole Angier that examines the life of W. G. Sebald. The book has seven "positive" reviews, five "rave" reviews, two "mixed" reviews, and one "pan" review according to review aggregator Book Marks.

References

2021 non-fiction books
English-language books
Bloomsbury Publishing books